The piriform aperture, pyriform aperture, or anterior nasal aperture, is a pear-shaped opening in the human skull.
Its long axis is vertical, and narrow end upward; in the recent state it is much contracted by the lateral nasal cartilage and the greater and lesser alar cartilages of the nose.

It is bounded above by the inferior borders of the nasal bones; laterally by the thin, sharp margins which separate the anterior from the nasal surfaces of the maxilla; and below by the same borders, where they curve medialward to join each other at the anterior nasal spine.

References

Nose